Nicola is a 1959 novel by the British writer Audrey Erskine Lindop. An attractive young woman returns to her home village after a term and prison, and discovers how much she is resented by some of the inhabitants.

References

Bibliography
 Vinson, James. Twentieth-Century Romance and Gothic Writers. Macmillan, 1982.

1959 British novels
Novels by Audrey Erskine Lindop
Novels set in England
William Collins, Sons books